The Voodoo Lounge is a Dublin city club and music venue, based on Arran Quay in the Smithfield region near Dublin City Center. A mainly rock-based venue, it also plays host to internationally touring metal, punk and dance acts.

Like the nearby The Dice Bar, it was owned by Huey Morgan, singer for New York band The Fun Lovin' Criminals. This is said, by the band, to be a reason for the venue selling pizza slices—they enjoyed Dublin night-life, but disliked the relative scarcity of places selling good pizza slices and so opened both a pizzeria attached to the existing Temple Bar venue Eamonn Doran's and the Voodoo Lounge.

The Voodoo Lounge hosted a mainly "alternative" crowd, and was popular with a variety of musical and youth subcultures.
Its alternative atmosphere was advanced further by its hosting of Dublin city's only regular fetish and BDSM club. The effect of playing host to such a mix of different "alternative" groups, without being heavily dominated by any one of them, produced a hip reputation and an atmosphere that contrasted with many other Dublin clubs.

The Voodoo Lounge premises was later used as a card club where primarily poker was played. It was known as Voodoo Card Club.

The Voodoo Lounge reopened as a cafe, bar and music venue in April 2013.

Voodoo Lounge is also a 1994 album by the Rolling Stones.

Music venues in Dublin (city)